Hunter Huss High School (abbreviated HHHS) is a public high school in the Gaston County Schools school district located in Gastonia, NC. It is the oldest existing high school building still used as a high school in Gaston County. Its attendance range covers southwestern Gaston County and includes the western portions of the City of Gastonia as well as the communities of South Gastonia and Crowders Mountain, and the surrounding rural area. The current principal is Dr. Bryan Denton.

History
Hunter Huss was opened in 1962 and named for Cherryville native and Superintendent of Gaston County Schools W. Hunter Huss (1902–1971) who served in that position from 1937 to 1968. The cost of construction at the time was $2.1 million, or $ in current value. The school opened to 818 ninth and tenth grade students on August 29, 1962. Two years later, it had 1,554 in grades ninth through twelfth.

Academics
Hunter Huss High School's Career Academy is part of Gaston County Schools' "School Choice Programs." The Career Academy prepares students for careers "in business, trade and industry, food service, public safety, health science, and technology." Previously, Hunter Huss was an International Baccalaureate (IB) World School.

According to the official Hunter Huss website: "The mission of Hunter Huss High School is to empower students to be lifelong learners and equip them to be successful members of society."

Facilities
The campus occupies 52 acres of land and has 178,000 square feet of indoor space. The auditorium can seat 1,465 and the gymnasium has a capacity for over 1,800. The school completed an $11 million renovation project in 2012. The renovations included a new heating and air conditioning system, replacement of some original windows, new plumbing throughout the entire building and extensive masonry work. Updated science labs, a new media center, wiring for wireless internet, and a television and broadcasting studio were also highlights of the improvements.

Achievements
 The Hunter Huss Chess Team won the 2004–2005, 2005–2006 and 2006–2007 3A Chess State Championships.
 In 2011 the Men's Basketball team won the 3A State Championship.

Notable alumni
 Rufus Crawford, NFL and CFL player
 Fred Durst, singer-songwriter best known as the frontman of the rap rock band Limp Bizkit
 Eric Augustus "Sleepy" Floyd, NBA player
 Kathy Harrington, member of North Carolina Senate
 Lamar Holmes, NFL and CFL player
 Maria Howell, actress and singer
 Billy James, co-host of John Boy and Billy radio
 Evan Karagias, professional wrestler and actor
 Kris Lang, professional basketball player
 Jon Robinson, radio and television personality
 Hassan Whiteside, NBA player
 Bubba Wilson, NBA player

References

"The Fabulous Years"(2007–2008 Hunter Huss Yearbook)

External links
Official Huss High School website
Alumni website

Education in Gaston County, North Carolina
Educational institutions established in 1962
Schools in Gaston County, North Carolina
Public high schools in North Carolina
Gastonia, North Carolina
1962 establishments in North Carolina